Rochester United F.C. is an English football club located in Strood, in Kent.

History
The club was founded in 1982 by Bernard Hurst as Templars and joined the Sunday Medway Football League. There they changed their name to Bly Spartans and played for 15 years before being promoted to the Senior Division. In 1997, the club successfully applied to join the Rochester and District Football League Division One. The following season they won the title and were promoted to the Premier Division. They were accepted into the Kent County Football League in 2000, being placed into the Division Three West. After two successive promotions as runners-up the club was in Division One West by 2003. In the 2006–07 season they finished runners-up, and the following season, after being transferred to Division One East, won the title as well as two cup competitions and were promoted to the Premier Division. The club achieved Chartered Status in 2009 and installed floodlights in 2010, leading to their successful application to become founder members of the Kent Invicta League, at level 10 of the English football league system for the first time.

In 2012, they became the inaugural champions of the Kent Invicta League and gained promotion to the Kent League. In May 2012 the club announced that they had sought permission to rename themselves Rochester United from the start of the 2012–13 season.

Ground

Rochester United play their home games at Rochester United Sports Ground, Rede Court Road, Strood, Kent, ME2 3TU.

Colours
Rochester United's colours are red and black shirts, black shorts and socks. The away kit is all white.

Honours
Kent Invicta Football League
Champions 2011–12
Kent County League Division One East
Champions 2007–08
Kent County League Division One West
 Runners-up 2003–04, 2006–07
Kent County League Division Two West
 Runners-up 2001–02
Kent County League Division Three West	
 Runners-up 2000–01
Rochester & District League
Division One champions 1997–98
Les Leckie Cup
Winners 2007–08
Floodlight Cup
Winners 2007–08
Inter-Regional Challenge Cup
Winners 2006–07
Runners-up 2007–08
Kent Invicta League Challenge Shield
Winners 2012

Records
FA Cup
First Qualifying Round 2015–16
FA Vase
First Round 2014–15

References

External links

Football clubs in England
Football clubs in Kent
Kent Invicta Football League
Southern Counties East Football League
Association football clubs established in 1982
1982 establishments in England